Aleksey Aleksandrovich Alipov (born 7 August 1975) is a Russian olympic Trap shooter. He is the 2004 Olympic champion in that discipline.

Career
Born in Moscow, he was trained at the Russian Academy of Sport. He participates for the Russian Army Sports Club, based in Moscow.

He competed at the 2000 Sydney Games where he finished ninth, but he achieved his ambition on 15 August 2004 at the Athens Olympics after a flawless final round in which he was on target with all 25 shots to finish with an overall score of 149 out of 150, beating Italy's Giovanni Pellielo into the silver medal position, while Australia's Adam Vella took bronze.

His hobbies include hunting and fishing, and he was in 2006 ranked eighth in the world in Trap by the International Shooting Sport Federation.

References

External links
 
 

1975 births
Living people
Russian male sport shooters
Olympic shooters of Russia
Shooters at the 2000 Summer Olympics
Shooters at the 2004 Summer Olympics
Shooters at the 2008 Summer Olympics
Shooters at the 2012 Summer Olympics
Shooters at the 2016 Summer Olympics
Olympic gold medalists for Russia
Olympic bronze medalists for Russia
Trap and double trap shooters
Sportspeople from Moscow
Olympic medalists in shooting
Medalists at the 2008 Summer Olympics
Medalists at the 2004 Summer Olympics
Shooters at the 2015 European Games
European Games gold medalists for Russia
European Games silver medalists for Russia
European Games medalists in shooting
Shooters at the 2019 European Games
European Games bronze medalists for Russia
Shooters at the 2020 Summer Olympics